TAT-4 was the fourth transatlantic telephone cable, in operation from 1965 to 1987. It operated at 384 kHz, initially carrying 128 telephone circuits between Saint-Hilaire-de-Riez, (France) and Tuckerton, New Jersey (United States). It was co-owned by AT&T and France Telecom.

References

Infrastructure completed in 1965
Transatlantic communications cables
France–United States relations
AT&T buildings
Orange S.A.
1965 establishments in France
1965 establishments in New Jersey
1987 disestablishments in France
1987 disestablishments in New Jersey